Sheila Swan (born 9 December 1978 in Perth, Scotland) is a Scottish curler and curling coach, a .

She is head coach of British wheelchair curling.

Teams

Record as a coach of national teams

References

External links

Sheila Swan's sporting life - sportscotland

Living people
1978 births
Sportspeople from Perth, Scotland
Scottish female curlers
World curling champions
Scottish curling champions
Continental Cup of Curling participants
Scottish curling coaches